Donald Scott Drysdale (July 23, 1936 – July 3, 1993) was an American professional baseball player and television sports commentator. A right-handed pitcher for the Brooklyn / Los Angeles Dodgers for his entire career in Major League Baseball, Drysdale was inducted into the Baseball Hall of Fame in 1984.

Drysdale won the  Cy Young Award and in  pitched a record six consecutive shutouts and  consecutive scoreless innings.

After his playing career, he became a radio/television broadcaster.

Early life
Drysdale was born in Van Nuys, Los Angeles, and attended Van Nuys High School, where one of his classmates was actor Robert Redford.

Playing career
Pitching for the Brooklyn and Los Angeles Dodgers, he teamed with Sandy Koufax during the late 1950s to middle 1960s to form one of the most dominating pitching duos in history.

Drysdale was a good hitting pitcher. In 14 seasons he had 218 hits in 1,169 at-bats for a .186 batting average, including 96 runs, 26 doubles, 7 triples, 29 home runs, 113 RBI and 60 bases on balls. Drysdale was occasionally used as a pinch-hitter, once during the World Series.

Drysdale and fellow Dodgers pitcher Sandy Koufax served six months in the United States Army Reserve at Fort Dix in New Jersey after the end of the 1957 season and before spring training in 1958. In his book entitled Once a Bum, Always a Dodger, Drysdale wrote: “Those six months were good for me. When you wake up at three-thirty every morning, and you realize that some of your buddies are just getting in back home, it gives you a lot of discipline. The service should be mandatory for every kid in America. You thought you were hot stuff being a major league pitcher, and then you went to Fort Dix and found out that it doesn’t matter who you were. There were no exceptions.”

In 1962, Drysdale won 25 games and the Cy Young Award. In 1963, he struck out 251 batters and won Game 3 of the World Series at Los Angeles's Dodger Stadium over the Yankees, 1–0. In 1965 he was the Dodgers' only .300 hitter and tied his own National League record for pitchers with seven home runs. That year, he also won 23 games and helped the Dodgers to their third World Championship in Los Angeles.

In 1968, Drysdale set Major League records with six consecutive shutouts and  consecutive scoreless innings. The latter record was broken by fellow Dodger Orel Hershiser 20 years later. Hershiser, however, did not match Drysdale's record of six consecutive complete-game shutouts.

Drysdale ended his career with 209 wins, 2,486 strikeouts, 167 complete games and 49 shutouts. He was inducted into the Baseball Hall of Fame in 1984, and had his number 53 retired at Dodger Stadium on July 1, 1984. At the time of his retirement, Drysdale was the last remaining player on the Dodgers who had played for Brooklyn.

He won three NL Player of the Month awards: June 1959 (6–0 record, 1.71 earned run average, 51 strikeouts), July 1960 (6–0 record, 2.00 earned run average, 48 strikeouts), and May 1968 (5–1 record, 0.53 earned run average, 45 strikeouts, with 5 consecutive shutouts to begin his scoreless inning streak, which was carried into June).

In 1965, Sandy Koufax declined to pitch the first game of the World Series because it was on Yom Kippur, a Jewish holy day. Drysdale pitched for the Dodgers instead of Koufax, giving up seven runs in  innings. When Walter Alston, the manager, came to the mound to remove him from the game, Drysdale said, "I bet right now you wish I was Jewish, too." The Dodgers lost the game to the Minnesota Twins 8–2 but went on to win the Series 4 games to 3.

Drysdale and Koufax took part in a famous salary holdout together in the spring of 1966. They had set an NL record the year before for strikeouts by teammates, with a combined total of 592. Both wanted to be paid $500,000 over three seasons, but Dodgers' GM Buzzie Bavasi preferred to give them one-year contracts according to team policy. They both finally signed one-year contracts just before the season opened. Drysdale's was for $105,000, and Koufax's was for $130,000. Those contracts made them the first pitchers to earn more than $100,000 a year.

After suffering a torn rotator cuff in 1969, Drysdale had to retire.

Pitching style
Nicknamed "Big D" by fans, Drysdale used brushback pitches and a sidearm fastball to intimidate batters, similar to his fierce fellow Hall of Famer Bob Gibson. Veteran Sal Maglie, also known for brushback pitches, taught Drysdale how to pitch aggressively when both were Dodger teammates in the 1950s. Drysdale led the NL in hit batters for four straight seasons from 1958 to 1961. His 154 hit batsmen is a modern National League record. "My own little rule was two for one," Drysdale said about his pitching. "If one of my teammates got knocked down, then I knocked down two on the other team."

Said Hall of Famer Frank Robinson, "He was mean enough to do it, and he did it continuously. You could count on him doing it. And when he did it, he just stood there on the mound and glared at you to let you know he meant it." "I don't think Don has ever tried intentionally to send someone to the hospital," said Maglie. "A pitcher needs to pitch inside. And if one of your teammates goes down, you do what you have to do to even the score, plain and simple."

Broadcasting career 

In 1970, Drysdale started a broadcasting career that continued for the rest of his life: first for the Montreal Expos (1970–1971), then the Texas Rangers (1972), California Angels (1973–1979, 1981), Chicago White Sox (1982–1987), NBC (1977), ABC (1978–1986), and finally back in Los Angeles with the Dodgers (from 1988 until his death in 1993). He also worked with his Angels' partner Dick Enberg on Los Angeles Rams football broadcasts from 1973–1976. Drysdale kept the fans' interest with stories of his playing days.

While at ABC Sports, Drysdale not only did baseball telecasts, but also regional college football games as well as Superstars and Wide World of Sports. In 1979, Drysdale covered the World Series Trophy presentation ceremonies for ABC. On October 11, 1980, Keith Jackson called an Oklahoma–Texas college football game for ABC in the afternoon, then flew to Houston to call Game 4 of the NLCS between the Houston Astros and Philadelphia Phillies. In the meantime, Drysdale filled in for Jackson on play-by-play for the early innings.

In 1984, Drysdale called play-by-play (alongside Reggie Jackson and Earl Weaver) for the National League Championship Series between the San Diego Padres and Chicago Cubs. On October 6, 1984, at San Diego's Jack Murphy Stadium, Game 4 of the NLCS ended when Padres first baseman Steve Garvey hit a two-run home run off of Lee Smith. Drysdale on the call:

In his last ABC assignment, Drysdale interviewed the winners in the Boston Red Sox's clubhouse following Game 7 of the 1986 American League Championship Series against the California Angels.

On August 14, 1983, while broadcasting for the White Sox, Drysdale generated some controversy while covering a heated argument between an umpire and Sox manager Tony La Russa. La Russa pulled up the third base bag and hurled it into the outfield, to the approval of the Comiskey Park crowd, and ensuring his ejection. Drysdale remarked, "Go get 'em, Dago!"

For the Sox, Drysdale broadcast Tom Seaver's 300th victory, against the host New York Yankees in 1985. His post-game interview with Seaver was carried live by both the Sox' network and the Yankees' longtime flagship television station WPIX.

1987
Drysdale hosted a nationally syndicated radio show called Radio Baseball Cards. 162 episodes were produced with stories and anecdotes told by current and former Major League Baseball players. The highlight of the series were numerous episodes dedicated to the memory and impact of Jackie Robinson as told by teammates, opponents and admirers. Radio Baseball Cards aired on 38 stations, including WNBC New York, KSFO San Francisco and WEEI Boston, as a pre-game show. A collector's edition of the program was re-released in 2007 as a podcast.

1988
Drysdale conducted all of the National League player interviews for the Baseball Talk series in 1988 (Joe Torre did the same for the American League).

On September 28, 1988, fellow Dodger Orel Hershiser surpassed Drysdale when Hershiser finished the season with a record 59 consecutive scoreless innings pitched. In his final start of the year, Hershiser needed to pitch 10 shutout innings to set the mark – meaning not only that he would have to prevent the San Diego Padres from scoring, but that his own team would also need to fail to score in order to ensure extra innings. The Dodgers' anemic offense obliged, and Hershiser pitched the first 10 innings of a scoreless tie, with the Padres eventually prevailing 2–1 in 16 innings. Hershiser almost did not pitch in the 10th inning, in deference to Drysdale, but was convinced to take the mound and try to break the record. When Hershiser broke Drysdale's record, Drysdale came onto the field to hug him, and said, "Oh, I'll tell ya, congratulations... And at least you kept it in the family."

Drysdale also called Kirk Gibson's walk-off home run in Game 1 of the 1988 World Series for the Dodgers Radio Network:

Personal life

In 1958, Drysdale married Ginger Dubberly, a native of Covington, Georgia, and a former Adrian fashion model.  The couple had a daughter, Kelly, but divorced in 1982. On November 1, 1986, he married basketball player Ann Meyers, who took the name Ann Meyers-Drysdale. Drysdale and Meyers had three children together: Don Junior ("DJ") (son), Darren (son), and Drew (daughter).

In 1990, Drysdale published his autobiography, Once a Bum, Always a Dodger.

Death
On July 2, 1993, Drysdale worked the television broadcast for the game between the Dodgers and the Montreal Expos at Olympic Stadium. After the game, he returned to his room at the hotel the team was staying at, Le Centre Sheraton. As the team left for the stadium the next morning, Drysdale was not with them. Several broadcast team members were sent back to the hotel once the team realized Drysdale had not arrived at the stadium, and when hotel personnel went up to Drysdale's room they discovered his body lying face down on the floor. The cause of death was ruled to be a heart attack, and the coroner's report determined that Drysdale had been dead for at least eighteen hours by the time he was found.

The Dodgers noted the death of their former star pitcher during the broadcast of the game later on that day. Drysdale's broadcasting colleague Vin Scully, who was instructed not to say anything on the air until Drysdale's family was notified, announced the news of his death by saying, "Never have I been asked to make an announcement that hurts me as much as this one. And I say it to you as best I can with a broken heart." Fellow broadcaster Ross Porter told his radio audience, "I just don't believe it, folks." 

While this was going on, word reached Drysdale's former White Sox colleague Ken Harrelson as he was calling that evening's game against the Baltimore Orioles at Comiskey Park for WGN television. Harrelson relayed the information to his audience, barely able to keep his composure while doing so. Dick Enberg, his broadcast partner with the Angels, said, "Every day was a good day when you were with Don Drysdale." 

Drysdale was replaced by Rick Monday in the broadcast booth.

Among the personal belongings found in Drysdale's hotel room was a cassette tape of Robert F. Kennedy's victory speech after the 1968 California Democratic presidential primary, a speech given only moments before Senator Kennedy's assassination. In the speech, Kennedy had noted, to the cheers of the crowd, that Drysdale had pitched his sixth straight shutout that evening. Drysdale had apparently carried the tape with him wherever he went since Kennedy's murder. Ronald Reagan was also a fan of Drysdale.

Drysdale's body was cremated and his ashes were placed in the Utility Columbarium in the Great Mausoleum at Forest Lawn Memorial Park in Glendale, California. They were returned to his family in February 2002 and scattered the next year.

Media

Television
Drysdale was a popular guest star in several television programs:

 With his first wife, Ginger, on February 26, 1959, edition of You Bet Your Life with host Groucho Marx. The episode was released on the 2006 DVD "Groucho Marx: You Bet Your Life – 14 Classic Episodes".
 In 1959, Drysdale appeared as a mystery challenger on the TV panel show To Tell the Truth.
 In 1960, Drysdale appeared in an episode of Lawman.
 The Millionaire episode "Millionaire Larry Maxwell", which was first broadcast on March 1, 1960.
 The Rifleman episode "Skull", which was first broadcast on January 1, 1962.
 Leave It to Beaver episode "Long Distance Call", which was first broadcast on June 16, 1962.
 The Donna Reed Show episodes "The Man in the Mask", first broadcast in 1962; "All Those Dreams", first broadcast in 1963; and "Play Ball" and "My Son the Catcher", both first broadcast in 1964. In all four episodes Drysdale plays himself, and in "All Those Dreams" he appeared with first wife, Ginger, and daughter Kelly.
 On the April 10, 1963, episode of The Beverly Hillbillies, "The Clampetts & The Dodgers", Drysdale and Leo Durocher play golf with Jed and Jethro, and Durocher finds out that Jed and Jethro are good baseball prospects.
 Our Man Higgins episode "Who's on First?" (May 8, 1963).
 On the May 2, 1964, episode of The Joey Bishop Show, "Joey and the L.A. Dodgers", Bishop guests are several members of the 1963 World Series Champions LA Dodgers. The teammates show off their various talents, the highlight being Drysdale, a natural singer, crooning "I Left My Heart In San Francisco".
 The Flying Nun episode "The Big Game" as the baseball game umpire, 1st episode of the 3rd season, aired September 17, 1969.
 The Brady Bunch episode "The Dropout", which was first broadcast on September 25, 1970.
 The Greatest American Hero (episode "The Two Hundred Mile an Hour Fastball", which was first broadcast on November 4, 1981, as a broadcaster for the California Stars.

Film
 Drysdale's 1958 Topps baseball card served as a focal point in the 2000 movie Skipped Parts starring Jennifer Jason Leigh. In it, a grandfather (R. Lee Ermey) makes his 14-year-old grandson (Bug Hall) throw a stack of baseball cards into a fire as a rite of passage of growing up. However, the boy saves the Drysdale baseball card, which is later seen in the final scene of the film.
 Drysdale appears as a soldier in the E-Club in The Last Time I Saw Archie (1961) starring Robert Mitchum and Jack Webb.
 Drysdale appears as himself (pitching) in the 1962 thriller Experiment in Terror starring Glenn Ford and Lee Remick.
 The number "53" used for Disney's Herbie the Love Bug was inspired by Drysdale.

See also

List of Major League Baseball all-time leaders in home runs by pitchers
List of Major League Baseball players who spent their entire career with one franchise
List of Major League Baseball individual streaks
List of Major League Baseball single-inning strikeout leaders
List of Major League Baseball career wins leaders
List of Major League Baseball annual strikeout leaders
List of Major League Baseball annual wins leaders
List of Major League Baseball career hit batsmen leaders
List of Major League Baseball career strikeout leaders
Major League Baseball titles leaders

References

External links

dondrysdale.com Official web site

Branch Rickey's 1954 amateur scouting report on Drysdale, at the Library of Congress.

Drysdale on You Bet Your Life in 1959

1936 births
1993 deaths
American radio sports announcers
American sportsmen
American television sports announcers
Bakersfield Indians players
Baseball players from California
Brooklyn Dodgers players
Burials at Forest Lawn Memorial Park (Glendale)
California Angels announcers
Chicago White Sox announcers
College football announcers
Cy Young Award winners
Los Angeles Dodgers announcers
Los Angeles Dodgers players
Los Angeles Rams announcers
Major League Baseball broadcasters
Major League Baseball pitchers
Major League Baseball players with retired numbers
Montreal Expos announcers
Montreal Royals players
National Baseball Hall of Fame inductees
National Football League announcers
National League All-Stars
National League strikeout champions
National League wins champions
People from Van Nuys, Los Angeles
Texas Rangers (baseball) announcers
Van Nuys High School alumni